Kangiqtualujjuaq (ᑲᖏᖅᑐᐊᓗᔾᔪᐊᖅ formerly Barrier Inlet is a body of water in Nunavut's Qikiqtaaluk Region. It lies in western Hudson Strait, forming a wedge into Baffin Island's Meta Incognita Peninsula and the western slopes of the Everett Mountains. Reversing Falls lie near the mouth of the inlet. Shaftesbury Inlet is to the northwest, while Qavarusiqtuuq is to the southeast

References

Inlets of Baffin Island